Vadim Kalmykov is a former Soviet and Ukrainian track and field athlete.

He represented the Soviet Union at the 1988 Summer Paralympics in Seoul, competing in four events in track and field and winning gold in all four. He was the USSR's most successful athlete at the 1988 Games. As this was the Soviet Union's first and only participation at the Summer Paralympic Games, he is the most successful Soviet Paralympian ever. Like all Soviet athletes, he competed in events for the visually impaired; the "B2" category denotes severe visual impairment, falling short of total blindness.

After a twelve-year absence, he returned just once to the Games, joining Ukraine's delegation to the 2000 Summer Paralympics in Sydney. He placed sixth in the triple jump, but won the bronze medal in the pentathlon.

References

External links
 

Living people
Visually impaired high jumpers
Visually impaired long jumpers
Visually impaired triple jumpers
Paralympic high jumpers
Paralympic long jumpers
Paralympic triple jumpers
Soviet male high jumpers
Soviet male long jumpers
Soviet male triple jumpers
Ukrainian male high jumpers
Ukrainian male long jumpers
Ukrainian male triple jumpers
Paralympic athletes of the Soviet Union
Paralympic athletes of Ukraine
Athletes (track and field) at the 1988 Summer Paralympics
Athletes (track and field) at the 2000 Summer Paralympics
Medalists at the 1988 Summer Paralympics
Medalists at the 2000 Summer Paralympics
Paralympic gold medalists for the Soviet Union
Paralympic bronze medalists for the Soviet Union
Year of birth missing (living people)
Paralympic medalists in athletics (track and field)